Rose Cliff, also known as Rose Cliff Fruit Farm, is a historic home located at Waynesboro, Virginia. It was built about 1850, and is a two-story, three-bay, Greek Revival style brick Shenandoah Valley farmhouse.  It has a central passage/double-pile plan under a hipped roof.  It was once the center of a thriving apple operation that lasted from the late-19th century until 1930.

It was listed on the National Register of Historic Places in 2006.  It is located in the Tree Streets Historic District.

References

Houses on the National Register of Historic Places in Virginia
Houses completed in 1850
Greek Revival houses in Virginia
Houses in Waynesboro, Virginia
National Register of Historic Places in Waynesboro, Virginia
Individually listed contributing properties to historic districts on the National Register in Virginia